This article is intended to give an overview of the demography of Slough. In 2016, Slough had a population of 149,000 people.

Population
The modern town of Slough grew from the parish of Upton-cum-Chalvey, Buckinghamshire, England. The populations given below are for the successive institutional areas of the principal local government level that could be recognised as Slough, now in Berkshire.

Ethnicity

The following table shows the ethnic group of respondents in the 1991, 2001 and 2011 censuses in Slough. Slough is a majority-minority town, with no ethnic group or broad multi-ethnic group being the majority, having been this way since the late 2000's. The White British make up the largest group at 34.5% of the population, having declined from a majority status of 58.3% in 2001, this decline coincides with the overall decline of White residents in the town from nearly two thirds in 1991 (72.3%) to less the majority (45.7%) in 2011. In conjunction, Asian British people have risen from nearly a quarter of the town's population in 1991 (23.9%) to nearly 40% in 2011, the largest of which is British Pakistanis who surpassed British Indians in 2011 as the largest Asian group. Black British residents have also increased, with the majority of growth coming from Black Africans who have increased from 0.4% in 1991 to 5.4% in 2011, of which surpassed the Black Caribbean group, who was 2.2% of the population, in 2011 as well.

Notes for table above

Ethnicity of school pupils 

Since statistics on the ethnicity of school pupils have been collected, White students, the majority being the native White British, have been in the minority. As such Slough schools were in a majority-minority state in-till 2018 when Asian British pupils became the majority, of which had surpassed White students in the mid 2000's. In the Asian British multi-ethnic group, British Pakistanis are the largest at 25.8% and are the largest group of all groups in the town. Black British school pupils increased in proportional size between 2004 to 2012 peaking at 9.1%, but have declined since then to 7.2% in 2022. Mixed school pupils have also been in proportional increase and now make up a little over 1 in 10 in schools (11.3%) from 5.9% in 2004.

Languages
The most common main languages spoken in Slough according to the 2011 UK Census are shown below.

Religion

The following table shows the religion of respondents in the 2001, 2011 and 2021 censuses in Slough. With Slough having one of the highest British Asian communities in Britain, the British Muslim, British Hindus and Sikh communities are all overrepresented compared to the national average.

See also

Demography of the United Kingdom
Demography of England
Demography of London
Demography of Birmingham
Demography of Greater Manchester
List of English cities by population
List of English districts by population
List of English districts and their ethnic composition
List of English districts by area
List of English districts by population density

References

Slough
Slough
Slough